The Federal University of Ceará (UFC) is a federal university with campuses in the cities of Fortaleza, Sobral, Barbalha, Russas, Quixadá and Crateús, in the state of Ceará, Brazil. UFC is a public and tuition-free university, with several academic programs in most areas of knowledge.

In Fortaleza, the university has three main campuses: "Campus do Pici", with the most of the programs in science and technology areas, "Campus do Benfica", which harbors the university's administration and the programs in humanities, business, and the law school, and the "Campus do Porangabussu", with the medical school. The campus of Sobral is new and has a Medical School, Computer Engineering, Electrical Engineering, Finance, Economy, Dentistry, Psychology and Teaching Music.

History
UFC was created by the Brazilian federal government in 1955 and is under the Ministry of Education. The University was created as the result of great public debate, which had begun in 1949. The main character of this movement was Antônio Martins Filho, an intellectual who became the first director of the recently created "Universidade do Ceará" ('University of Ceará'). The University itself was created by Law #2.373, ratified in December 1954 and began to function on June 25, 1955. Its implementation was owed to the union of the several higher education institutes then present in the city of Fortaleza: the School of Agronomy, the Law College of Ceara, the Medicine College and the Pharmacy & Odontology College. Today, the University consists of four centers of basic science and education and five professional colleges, and is one of the most respected universities of Brazil.

See also
Brazil University Rankings
Universities and Higher Education in Brazil
Universidade da Integração Internacional da Lusofonia Afro-Brasileira

References

External links

 

Ceara
Educational institutions established in 1955
Buildings and structures in Fortaleza
Education in Ceará
1955 establishments in Brazil